Shirland and Higham is a civil parish in the North East Derbyshire district of Derbyshire, England.  The parish contains 42 listed buildings that are recorded in the National Heritage List for England.  Of these, one is listed at Grade II*, the middle of the three grades, and the others are at Grade II, the lowest grade. The parish contains the villages of Shirland, Higham and Stonebroom and the surrounding area.  Most of the listed buildings are houses, cottages, farmhouses and farm buildings. The other listed buildings include two churches, a former Friends' meeting house and school, a former watermill, a village cross, bridges and mileposts.


Key

Buildings

References

Citations

Sources

 

Lists of listed buildings in Derbyshire